Huang Xuhua (born 12 March 1926) is a Chinese mechanical engineer, and the second chief designer for the country's first generation of nuclear submarines (Type 091 and Type 092). He is director emeritus of the Wuhan-based 719 Research Institute (Nuclear Submarine Institute) of China Shipbuilding Industry Corporation, and is an academician of the Chinese Academy of Engineering. His name was classified until 1987.

Biography 
Huang was born on 12 March 1926 in Swabue, Kwangtung Province, of Jieyang ancestry. He graduated from Shanghai Jiao Tong University in 1949.

After the Sino-Soviet split, Marshal Nie Rongzhen proposed that China develop its own nuclear submarines to break the duopoly of the United States and the Soviet Union, and Mao Zedong accepted the suggestion. In 1958, Huang was among the 29 people selected to develop the program, meant to bolster China's nuclear deterrence against the US and the USSR. They were based in Huludao, a port on the Bohai Sea in Liaoning Province.

At the time China was in the midst of the great famine caused by the Great Leap Forward, and technical knowledge was severely limited. Huang and his colleagues had very primitive resources, using abacuses to do calculations and gathering information from foreign newspapers. When a Chinese diplomat brought from the US toy models of the George Washington-class submarine, Huang was elated to find out that the design his team had made on paper was almost identical to the models.

When the turmoil of the Cultural Revolution swept through China, Huang and other engineers came under persecution. In the late 1960s, Huang, together with scientist Qian Lingxi, was attacked for his "reactionary" background and sent to perform hard labour in the countryside, where he spent two years raising pigs. In retrospect, Huang remembered these years as "the only easy time" of his life, as he had no responsibilities other than feeding the pigs.

In 1970, the Long March I, China's first nuclear submarine, began maritime tests. She entered service in 1974, making China the fifth country to own a nuclear submarine, after the United States, the USSR, the United Kingdom, and France. The boat was decommissioned more than four decades later, and is now displayed in the Chinese Navy Museum in Qingdao. The first nuclear-powered ballistic missile submarine (SSBN) of class 092 was completed and commissioned in 1981. In 1983, Huang Xuhua succeeded Peng as the 2nd chief designer and continued working on the nuclear submarine project.

Honours and publicity
In November 2017, Huang was awarded the honour of "National Model for Virtue". In a nationally televised ceremony in Beijing, to show his respect for two senior citizens who dedicated their lives to contribute to the nation, Paramount leader Xi Jinping personally invited Huang to sit next to him for a group photo. The event was widely reported in Chinese media.

In September 2019, Huang was awarded the Medal of the Republic, China's highest order of honour. In January 2020, he was conferred the Highest Science and Technology Award, together with meteorologist Zeng Qingcun.

Huang was often hailed in Chinese media as "the father of China's nuclear submarines", but this has been disputed by the naval writer Li Zhongxiao and some scientific-technical staff of the first generation of China's nuclear submarines. According to them, the nuclear submarine was developed by many scientists and did not have a single "father"; and if a single person were to be considered the "father", it should be Peng Shilu, the first chief designer, not Huang, who succeeded Peng as the second chief designer.

Personal life 
Huang is married and has three daughters. His immediate family moved with him to Huludao for his secret mission, but he had to reduce contact with the rest of his family. He only rarely visited his parents in Guangdong, who had no idea what he was doing until his role was made public in a 1987 magazine article.

References 

1926 births
Living people
Engineers from Guangdong
Members of the Chinese Academy of Engineering
Chinese naval architects
People from Shanwei
Recipients of the Order of the Republic (China)
National Chiao Tung University (Shanghai) alumni
Submarine design